Worlds End is a small village in the civil parish of Denmead in the City of Winchester district of Hampshire, England. It has one of the oldest postboxes in the United Kingdom.

Notes

Villages in Hampshire